Giorgio Piccinelli (13 January 1930 – 14 October 2000) was an Italian sprint canoer who competed in the early 1950s. He competed in the K-1 1000 m event at the 1952 Summer Olympics in Helsinki, but was eliminated in the heats. He was born in Mariano Comense.

Piccinelli died on 14 October 2000 in Vasto, aged 70.

References

External links
 

1930 births
2000 deaths
Canoeists at the 1952 Summer Olympics
Italian male canoeists
Olympic canoeists of Italy
20th-century Italian people